Toowoomba Wellcamp Airport  is an airport in Wellcamp,  west from the CBD of Toowoomba, Queensland, Australia. It was known as Brisbane West Wellcamp Airport until November 2017.

The airport and an associated aviation and business park is the brainchild of the Wagner family, a business family prominent in the Toowoomba region. It is the first major greenfield public airport development in Australia since Melbourne Airport opened in 1970. It is also the first privately funded major airport in the country.

The airport is estimated to have a catchment area of 344,000 people and in 2017 handled 157,000 passengers (a 25.9% growth from the previous year), making it the 33rd busiest regional airport in Australia annually.

History

The Toowoomba region had not been serviced by a jet-capable airport at any time in the city's history. The extant Toowoomba City Aerodrome at Wilsonton in suburban residential Toowoomba has been historically restricted in development due to local council land development policy and poor local planning, although a runway extension in 2011 allowed for improved scheduled services with turboprop aircraft.

The Darling Downs and Surat Basin regions were subject to significant growth between 2005 and 2013, primarily due to coal mining and coal seam gas exploration. This industrial expansion coupled with the development of a transport hub and industrial estate at Charlton (10 km west of Toowoomba) provided the land corridor immediately west of Toowoomba with government-endorsed transport development opportunities.

Construction on the site, a former quarry owned by the Wagner family since 1994, began in April 2013, with an ambitious timeframe for completion by October 2014.

On 22 November 2013, a Beechcraft King Air owned and piloted by John Wagner became the first aircraft to land on the new runway. On 15 January 2014, the first concrete for the terminal building was poured. In June 2014, work began on sealing the runway and movement areas using EFC, a low-carbon cement-free concrete developed by Wagners, boosting the airport's green credentials.

On 3 September 2014, Qantas became the first airline to announce regular services from the airport. Regional services operated under contract to the Government of Queensland transferred from Toowoomba City Aerodrome to Wellcamp on 1 January 2015. On 17 November 2014, the first scheduled passenger service commenced, operating between Sydney Airport and Wellcamp airport.

On 23 November 2015, the first jumbo aircraft arrived from Sydney. The Cathay Pacific 747 freighter aircraft made a brief stop en route from Sydney Airport to Hong Kong to collect produce bound for China. The trial service uplifted 58 tonnes of fresh produce during the stop.

In March 2016, services to Cairns and Melbourne with Airnorth commenced, followed by Townsville in November.

In October 2016, Cathay Pacific announced the opening of weekly cargo services starting on 22 November 2016, from Wellcamp to Hong Kong using a 747 freighter aircraft. The service originates in Sydney and stops in Melbourne and Wellcamp before proceeding to Hong Kong. Cathay Pacific also announced that the first cargo export booking from Toowoomba was for a live crocodile.

On 22 October 2016, the first international passenger flight stopped at Wellcamp airport. This also marked the first Airbus A330 flight at the airport. The service was a charter originating in Sydney before stopping at Wellcamp to collect 250 people traveling to Shanghai, China for a trade conference.

On 11 November 2016, the airport was designated as an international airport and as a regional international gateway.

In July 2018, Airnorth announced the cancellation of the Wellcamp-Cairns route from October 2018.

In 2019, a one off flight to the airport was carried out by TNT, as well as DHL later that year. The airport also has a weekly Cathay Pacific Cargo flight with a Boeing 747 arriving via Sydney.

In February 2022, Bonza announced that the airport would become one of its 17 destinations with the airline planning to fly to Melbourne, Townsville and Proserpine from Toowoomba Wellcamp.

Controversy
The Wagner family submitted to the amalgamated Toowoomba Regional Council a plan for a large-scale airport and industrial development in 2012, utilising an extant planning code from the pre-amalgamated council statutes. The submission occurred on the last available day prior to post-amalgamation planning codes taking effect. This resulted in a diminished requirement for community consultation which was met with scepticism by some media and local residents.

The initial submission was also completed without consultation with local airspace owners, primarily the Department of Defence, which controls much of the local airspace via the Oakey and Amberley military restricted airspace zones. This has subsequently required considerable consultation, and has been complicated by effective endorsement of the privately funded public airport development at all governmental levels despite potential impacts on the Department of Defence. Changes to the military airspace around Oakey and Amberley were subsequently announced in November 2013 to allow the continuation of military flying activities at these bases and civilian operations from Wellcamp once it became operational.

Transport hub

The new airport location is adjacent to the Toowoomba Bypass, section of the bypass between Charlton and Athol that passes by the airport is a single carriageway. The airport location is also near the planned Australian standard gauge inland rail corridor which would link Melbourne with Brisbane, thus providing a potential road-air-rail hub.

Aviation school
In December 2014 the airport announced the development of an aviation education precinct, a joint project with the Airline Academy of Australia and University of Southern Queensland, to train pilots and offer courses in aircraft maintenance, engineering and electronics. The first students commenced training in February 2015.

Qantas' first Pilot Training Academy will open at the Wellcamp Airport in 2020.

Asia Pacific Aircraft Storage
On 30 September 2020 it was announced that the aircraft storage facility operated by Asia Pacific Aircraft Storage at Alice Springs Airport was approaching capacity, and some additional aircraft would be stored at Wellcamp Airport.

Projected future
The airport is expected to act as a major air freight hub, including live livestock export via air. The terminal is projected to be 9,000 square metres on opening, and have the capacity to be developed to handle in excess of 500,000 passengers annually by 2019. Due to its proximity to Brisbane and long runway, it is expected that Toowoomba Wellcamp will become an alternative for diverted domestic and international flights when weather conditions prevent landing at Brisbane and Gold Coast Airports.

Manufacturing
A new facility called the Wellcamp Aerospace and Defence Precinct was announced on 21 September 2021. On the same date, Boeing Australia announced plans to build a drone manufacturing facility at Wellcamp for the Boeing MQ-28 Ghost Bat project. This deal is worth up to $1 billion for Queensland's economy over 10 years.

Spaceport
In September 2022, Virgin Orbit signed an agreement with Wagner Corporation to base a Boeing 747-400 launch aircraft at Wellcamp with a demonstrator small satellite launch planned for 2024.

Airlines and destinations

Passenger

Cargo

Statistics

See also
 List of airports in Australia
 Toowoomba City Aerodrome

References

External links
 

Airports in Queensland
Transport in Toowoomba
Airports established in 2014
2014 establishments in Australia